Guided Tour may refer to:

 Guided tour
 Guided Tour (album), a 2013 album by Gary Burton
 Guided Tour (short story collection), a collection of science fiction stories by Gordon R. Dickson